Charles Philippe Hippolyte de Thierry (April 1793 – 8 July 1864) was a nineteenth-century adventurer who attempted to establish his own sovereign state in New Zealand in the years before the Treaty of Waitangi between the British Crown and the Maori chiefs in 1840.

Biography

De Thierry was from a French family that had fled to England following the revolution. He claimed to have been born in 1793 while his parents were fleeing, probably in Grave in the Netherlands. Upon reaching England, his father Charles Antoine de Thierry, claimed the title of Baron Nasher.

De Thierry was enrolled at Magdalen College, Oxford, and claimed to have transferred to a college of the University of Cambridge. There, he met Hongi Hika, the Ngāpuhi chief who was visiting England, and the missionary Thomas Kendall. The land was bought for the price of about 500 muskets plus powder and ball which de Thierry sent to Sydney, Australia. Hongi Hika uplifted the weapons on his return to Sydney. It was this act that ignited the inter-iwi and inter-hapu Musket Wars in New Zealand, which continued until about 1842.

After travels in North America and the Caribbean, de Thierry came to the Pacific in 1835.  In the Marquesas Islands, he announced himself King of Nuku Hiva and wrote to James Busby, the British Resident in New Zealand, of his intentions to land there and establish himself as "sovereign chief". His kingdom would embrace free trade and medicine, and share its "occasional bounties" with local chiefs. In Sydney 1837 he recruited some locals to join his adventure, but when he arrived in the Hokianga, rangatira (chiefs) Tāmati Wāka Nene and Eruera Maihi Patuone repudiated his claims. He was allowed to settle at a smaller, 800-acre plot by Nene and Te Taonui. The settlement was a failure, however, as de Thierry's followers rioted and abandoned him, and he was dependent on Māori charity. Despite his failures, he continued to exaggerate his successes to France and agitate for the establishment of a French colony led by himself. Any possibility of this was finally curtailed with the signing of the Treaty of Waitangi in 1840.

De Thierry subsequently moved to Auckland, where he worked as a piano teacher until his sudden death on 8 July 1864.

Footnotes

References 

 
 

1793 births
1864 deaths
Alumni of Magdalen College, Oxford
Dutch emigrants to England
Dutch emigrants to New Zealand
Dutch people of French descent
Burials at Symonds Street Cemetery
People from Grave, North Brabant
English emigrants to New Zealand